The Stade montchaninois Bourgogne is a French rugby union club founded in 1961 nowadays playing in regional championship of Bourgogne. 
In past play in the French Rugby championship, first division

Palmarès 
 Winner of  Coupe of l'Espérance e1990
 Winner of Challenge of l'Espérance 1973-75
 Finalist of Group B2 in 1993
 Finalist du Fédérale 3in 1966

External links 
 Official Site

French rugby union clubs
Monchanin